Sumichrast's garter snake (Thamnophis sumichrasti) is a species of snake in the family Colubridae. The species is endemic to Mexico.

Etymology
The specific name sumichrasti is in honor of the Swiss-born Mexican naturalist Adrien Jean Louis François Sumichrast (1828–1882).

Geographic range
Thamnophis sumichrasti is found in the Mexican states of Chiapas, Hidalgo, Oaxaca, Puebla, Querétaro, San Luis Potosí, Tabasco, and Veracruz.

Habitat
The preferred natural habitats of T. sumichrasti are freshwater wetlands and forest.

Reproduction
T. sumichrasti is viviparous.

References

Further reading
Cope ED (1866). "On the REPTILIA and BATRACHIA of the Sonoran Province of the Nearctic Region". Proceedings of the Acadademy of Natural Sciences of Philadelphia 18: 300–314. (Eutaenia sumichrasti, new species, p. 306).
Heimes, Peter (2016). Snakes of Mexico: Herpetofauna Mexicana Vol. I. Frankfurt am Main, Germany: Chimaira. 572 pp. .
Rossman DA (1966). "Evidence for Conspecificity of the Mexican Garter Snakes Thamnophis phenax (Cope) and Thamnophis sumichrasti (Cope)". Herpetologica 22 (4): 303–305.

Reptiles described in 1866
Taxa named by Edward Drinker Cope
Reptiles of Mexico
Thamnophis